Elizabeth LaCharla Wright (born January 22, 1980) is an American jazz and gospel singer.

Life and career
Wright was born in the small town of Hahira, Georgia, one of three children and the daughter of a minister and the musical director of their church. She started singing gospel music and playing piano in church as a child, and also became interested in jazz and blues. She attended Houston County High School, where she was heavily involved in choral singing, receiving the National Choral Award. She went on to Georgia State University in Atlanta to study singing.

Since then she has studied at The New School in New York, and in Vancouver, BC.

Wright joined the Atlanta-based vocal quartet In the Spirit in 2000, and in 2002 she signed a recording contract with Verve Records, where her musical compositions and vocal style led her to be compared to that of Norah Jones.

Her first album, Salt, was released in the spring of 2003 and reached No. 2 on the Billboard Top Contemporary Jazz chart in 2004. Her next release maintained the jazz and pop blend, while incorporating folk music. Dreaming Wide Awake was released in June 2005 and reached No. 1 on the Top Contemporary Jazz chart in 2005 and 2006.

In 2008, Wright released The Orchard to positive reviews. She released her fourth album, Fellowship, in 2010. Most songs on Fellowship are gospel standards.

Discography

 Salt (Verve, 2003)
 Dreaming Wide Awake (Verve Forecast, 2005) 
 The Orchard (Verve Forecast, 2008) 
 Fellowship (Verve Forecast, 2010) 
 Freedom & Surrender (Concord, 2015) 
 Grace (Concord, 2017)
 Holding Space (Blues & Greens, 2022)

As guest
 "No One but Myself to Blame" and "Fool's Gold" on The Pecan Tree by Joe Sample (2002)
 "...Till Then" and "The Fiddle and the Drum" on ...Till Then by Danilo Pérez (2003)
 "Don't Let Me Be Lonely Tonight" on Closer by David Sanborn (2005)
 "Come Rain or Come Shine" on One More for the Road by Toots Thielemans (2006)
 "Freedom" (backing vocals) on Supply and Demand by Amos Lee (2006)
 "Reaching for the Moon" with Regina Carter and Russell Malone on We All Love Ella: Celebrating the First Lady of Song (2007)
 "Whispering Pines", a duet with Jakob Dylan produced by Joe Henry for Endless Highway: The Music of The Band (2007)
 "Stillness: Winterhouse" on Persona by Massimo Biolcati (2008)
 "I Wish I Knew (How It Feels to Be Free)" with pianist Takana Miyamoto and Marcus Printup on Promises Made: The Millennium Promise Jazz Project produced by Kirk Whalum (2008) 
 "A Change Is Gonna Come" on Nordstrom's The Royal Blues: Celebrating the Queens of Blues and Jazz (2009)
 "Nobody's Fault but Mine" on Pour une âme souveraine: A Dedication to Nina Simone by Meshell Ndegeocello (2012)
 "Backward Country Boy Blues" by Duke Ellington on Terri Lyne Carrington's Money Jungle: Provocative in Blue (2013)
 "When I Found You" by Patrice Rushen on Terri Lyne Carrington's The Mosaic Project: Love and Soul (2015)
 "This Song in Me", co-written by Wright with producer Derrick Hodge for We Are the Drum by Kendrick Scott Oracle (2015)
 "Om Sweet Om" on Taj Mo by Taj Mahal and Keb' Mo' (2017)
 "Take Me Home" by José James for his album No Beginning No End 2 (2020)

References

Sources and external links

 Official website
 "Portrait of the artist: Lizz Wright, singer"

1980 births
Living people
People from Hahira, Georgia
Singers from Georgia (U.S. state)
American contraltos
American gospel singers
American women jazz singers
American jazz singers
Ballad musicians
Concord Records artists
Smooth jazz singers
Verve Records artists
21st-century African-American women singers